Jack L. Tilley (born December 3, 1948) is an American businessman and retired United States Army soldier. He served for almost 37 years in the United States Army, culminating in his appointment in 2000 as the 12th Sergeant Major of the Army, a post he held until his retirement on January 15, 2004. He was the last Vietnam War veteran to serve in that position.

Early life

Tilley was born in Vancouver, Washington, on December 3, 1948 and enlisted in the United States Army under the "Buddy Program" with his friend Barney Boykin. They both attended basic combat training at Fort Lewis, Washington, advanced training at Fort Knox, Kentucky, and basic airborne training at Fort Benning, Georgia. Barney was killed in action in 1968 during the Vietnam War.

Military career
Tilley's first assignment was to the Republic of Vietnam with A Troop, 1st Squadron, 4th Cavalry Regiment as a vehicle crewman. Upon completion of his 1-year deployment he was assigned as a drill sergeant at Fort Benning, Georgia, until his enlistment expired; Tilley left the active duty army for two years and served in the Reserve Component before enlisting again in the Active Component in September 1971.

Tilley held a variety of important positions culminating in his assignment as the Sergeant Major of the Army. He previously held the senior enlisted position as Senior Enlisted Leader of the United States Central Command at MacDill Air Force Base, Florida. Other assignments he held as command sergeant major were 1st Battalion, 10th Cavalry, Fort Knox, 194th Armored Brigade, 1st Armored Division, Bad Kreuznach, Germany, and United States Army Space and Missile Defense Command, Arlington, Virginia.

Tilley held every key leadership position including tank commander, section leader, drill sergeant, platoon sergeant, senior instructor, operations sergeant and first sergeant. His military education includes the First Sergeants Course and the Sergeants Major Academy. He is a graduate of the basic airborne course, drill sergeant school and the master gunner's course.

Awards and decorations

 11 service stripes.

Post-military career
Tilley retired from the army in January 2004 and served as the Chief Executive of JTilley, Inc., a services company based in Tampa, Florida, that specializes in placing military leaders into corporate America.
As of April 2019, Jack is now a Senior Vice President with NewDay USA.

Philanthropy
Tilley is the co-founder, Chairman, and CEO of the non-profit  American Freedom Foundation. This organization creates awareness and building support of their service, sacrifice and needs through partnerships with military focused organizations. The organization also sponsors military career fairs and hiring events regularly in major military areas around the country. These events are usually in conjunction with high-profile concerts or entertainment. Special emphasis is always given to the men and women who were wounded in action.

As an author 
Tilley is the author of the book Soldier for Life: Lessons from the 12th Sergeant Major of the Army Jack L. Tilley.

References

The Sergeants Major of the Army,  Daniel K. Elder, Center of Military History, United States Army Washington, D.C. 2003.

1948 births
United States Army personnel of the Vietnam War
Recipients of the Legion of Merit
Recipients of the Defense Superior Service Medal
Sergeants Major of the Army
Businesspeople from Vancouver, Washington
Living people
American Security Council Foundation